Inspiration is a British-designed and -built steam-propelled car designed by Glynne Bowsher and developed by the British Steam Car Challenge team.

This broke the and longest-standing land speed record set in 1906 by Fred Marriott in the Stanley Steamer.

The runs were made at Edwards Air Force Base in California, United States. The car is 7.6 m long, 1.7 m wide and weighs 3 tons. It is powered by a two-stage turbine driven by superheated steam from 12 boilers containing distilled water. The boilers are heated by burners which burn Liquid Petroleum Gas to produce 3 Megawatts (10.2 million BTU/hr) of heat. The steam produced is at a temperature of 400 °C (750 °F) and a pressure of 4000 kN/m2 . The engine is capable of developing  and consumes around 40 litres (8.8 Impgal) of water per minute).

The car has been retired to the National Motor Museum Trust at Beaulieu, England.

Notes

External links
Official website of the BSCC
BBC News item with video footage

Wheel-driven land speed record cars
Steam cars